Callum Zinzan Taylor (born 19 June 1998) is a Welsh cricketer. He made his Twenty20 debut on 9 August 2019, for Glamorgan in the 2019 t20 Blast. He made his first-class debut on 22 August 2020, for Glamorgan in the 2020 Bob Willis Trophy, scoring a century in the first innings. Taylor became the fourth batsman for Glamorgan to score a century on debut in a first-class match. He made his List A debut on 22 July 2021, for Glamorgan in the 2021 Royal London One-Day Cup.

References

External links
 

1998 births
Living people
Welsh cricketers
Glamorgan cricketers
Wales National County cricketers
Sportspeople from Newport, Wales